Segusium may refer to:

 Segusium (association), referred to Society for Research and Studies of Susa valley, non-profit organization
 Susa, Piedmont, Segusium is a variant of the Roman name Segusio, referred to the city in Susa Valley